Sonnal Thaan Kaadhala is a 2001 Indian Tamil-language romantic drama film written, directed and produced by T. Rajendar, who also composed the music and portrays the main lead role. Murali, Roja, Karan, Livingston, Swathi and Vadivelu play other important roles. The film released on 25 May 2001.

Plot 

T. R. (T. Rajendar) investigates a case in which Roja (Roja) is the lead female singer. Roja works in a finance firm and has a big family of three sisters, a brother (Kuralarasan Rajendar), an alcoholic father (Manivannan), and a mother (Vadivukkarasi) to support. Murali (Murali), her office colleague, loves her and makes his intention clear in every opportunity that he gets. However, Roja has no time for him. T. R. has a sister named Saro (Swathi), who is married to a corrupt cop named Inbaraj (Karan). Inbaraj, furious about T. R. exposing him in his newspaper, harasses Saro, egged on by his avaricious mother (Y. Vijaya) and sister (Bhuvaneswari). The burden of taking care of the family becomes a little too much for Roja. Finally T. R., against all odds, advises Roja to accept Murali's love.

Cast 

T. Rajendar as T. R. (director)
Murali as Murali
Roja as Roja
Karan as Inspector Inbaraj
Vadivukkarasi as Roja's mother
Manivannan as Roja's father
Vadivelu as Roja's brother-in-law
Kuralarasan as Roja's brother
Kovai Sarala as Roja's elder sister
Rajashree as Roja's sister
Livingston as Roja's uncle
Khushbu as Mumtaj
M. N. Nambiar as Mumtaj's father
Swathi as Saro, T. R.'s sister
Y. Vijaya as Inbaraj's mother
Vennira Aadai Moorthy as Inbaraj's father
Bhuvaneswari as Inbaraj's sister
Rajeev as Roja's boss
Pandu as Film Director
Idichapuli Selvaraj as Constable
Mumtaj as Chitra
Charle
Madhan Bob
Anu Mohan
Dhamu
V. K. Ramasamy
Vaiyapuri
Silambarasan in a special appearance in 2 songs

Production 
T. Rajender announced that his son Silambarasan would play the lead role in Kadhal Azhivathillai in 2000. After failing to find a suitable lead actress to appear opposite Silambarasan, Rajender postponed the project and started to make Sonnal Thaan Kaadhala. Bobby, actress Rajashri's sister, was cast in a leading role, but the actress opted to work on other Telugu films instead. Subsequently, her role in Sonnal Thaan Kaadhala was shortened, as Rajender continued to shoot without her.

Soundtrack 
There are eight songs composed by T. Rajendar.

"Chukkumala Chukkumala" – Silambarasan Rajendar, Tippu
"Kaathalikka Theriyuma" – Krishnaraj, T. Rajendar
"Mullaaga Kuththakoodaathu" – Silambarasan Rajendar
"Rosaappoove" – Balesh, K. J. Yesudas
"Sonnalthaan" – K. S. Chithra, Hariharan
"Sonnalthan" – Hariharan
"Vaada Vaada" -
"Vela Vela" – T. Rajendar, Shankar Mahadevan

Reception 
Although the film was an average grosser at the box office, the soundtrack was somewhat a success. The film won two separate awards the following year; a Tamil Nadu State Film Award and a Filmfare Award.

References

External links 
 

2000s Tamil-language films
2001 films
2001 romantic drama films
Films directed by T. Rajendar
Indian romantic drama films
Films scored by T. Rajendar
Films with screenplays by T. Rajendar